Serbian singer and songwriter Tea Tairović has released one studio album, 16 singles (including four as a featured artist), two promotional singles and 35 music videos.

Albums

Studio albums

Singles

As lead artist

As featured artist

Promotional singles

Other charted songs

Guest appearances

Songwriting credits

Music videos

References

Tairovic, Tea
Tairovic, Tea
Tairovic, Tea